Lycée Flora Tristan is a French senior high school/sixth-form college in Noisy-le-Grand, in the Paris metropolitan area.

References

External links
 Lycée Flora Tristan 

Lycées in Seine-Saint-Denis
Lycées in Marne-la-Vallée